Operation Anvil was a series of 21 nuclear tests conducted by the United States in 1975–1976 at the Nevada Test Site. These tests followed the Operation Bedrock series and preceded the Operation Fulcrum series.

References

Explosions in 1975
Explosions in 1976
1975 in military history
1976 in military history
Anvil
History of Nye County, Nevada
1975 in Nevada
1976 in Nevada